Luca Buongiorno (born 19 September 1997) is an Italian footballer who plays as a midfielder for Tritium.

Career statistics

Notes

References

1997 births
Living people
Italian footballers
Association football midfielders
A.C. Milan players
A.C. Legnano players
A.S. Pro Piacenza 1919 players
Tritium Calcio 1908 players
Serie C players